Eodorcadion heros is a species of beetle in the family Cerambycidae. It was described by Jakovlev in 1899.

References

Dorcadiini
Beetles described in 1899